Astrothelium fijiense is a species of corticolous (bark-dwelling), crustose lichen in the family Trypetheliaceae. Found in Fiji, it was formally described as a new species in 2016 by Robert Lücking, Khwanruan Naksuwankul, and Helge Thorsten Lumbsch. Both the thallus and the  contain lichexanthone, a lichen product that causes these structures to fluoresce a yellow colour when lit with a long-wavelength UV light. The species epithet fijiense refers to the type locality. The characteristics of the lichen that distinguish it from others in genus Astrothelium are the distinctly pseudostromatic ascomata, and the presence of lichexanthone on the pseudostromata. Astrothelium cinereorosellum is somewhat similar, but that species has slightly longer ascospores and does not have lichexanthone on the pseudostromata.

References

fijiense
Lichen species
Lichens described in 2016
Taxa named by Robert Lücking
Taxa named by Helge Thorsten Lumbsch
Lichens of the Pacific